Nelson Panciatici (born 26 September 1988) is a French professional racing driver.

Career

Karting
Born in Reims, Panciatici started his karting career in 1998 and continued until 2004. His best championship position was 2nd place in 2004 in the French Championship Elite.

Formula Renault 2.0
In 2005 he participated in the Formula Renault 2.0 France championship for the first time with the team Epsilon Sport. He finished 13th overall and was 2nd rookie.

In 2006 he raced in both the Formula Renault 2.0 French and Eurocup championships placing 5th in the French championship with 1 win. Since he only raced in 2 of the Eurocup races he was not classified that season.

In 2007 Panciatici was selected to be a part of the Renault Driver Development and continued to race in the Formula Renault 2.0 Eurocup and French championships. He was very quick in the pre-season testing, but he had a tough season in both the French championship and the Eurocup with only 3 podiums. At the end of the season he switched from the team SG Formula to the team Boutsen-Energy Racing and had some better results there.

Spanish Formula Three
In 2008 he raced in the Spanish Formula Three Championship with the Q8 Oils Hache Team. He was the runner-up in the overall championship and runner-up in the Spanish Cup (Copa de España), despite scoring more points than champion Natacha Gachnang. He also forayed into the Formula Three Euroseries, appearing at Le Mans, for RC Motorsport. He finished the races in fifteenth and eighteenth places.

GP2 Series

For 2009, Panciatici moved up into the GP2 Series, having been announced as the Durango team's second driver on 21 March 2009. Panciatici partnered veteran of the series Davide Valsecchi and Stefano Coletti as Durango failed to improve on their 11th-place finish in 2008.

Formula Renault 3.5
Panciatici will move into the Formula Renault 3.5 Series for the 2010 season, partnering Daniil Move at the newly renamed Lotus Racing Junior Team.

Racing record

Career summary

† - Panciatici was ineligible to score points.

Complete GP2 Series results
(key) (Races in bold indicate pole position) (Races in italics indicate fastest lap)

Superleague Formula

2009
(Races in bold indicate pole position) (Races in italics indicate fastest lap)

2009 Super Final Results
Super Final results in 2009 did not count for points towards the main championship.

Complete Formula Renault 3.5 Series results
(key) (Races in bold indicate pole position) (Races in italics indicate fastest lap)

† Driver did not finish the race, but was classified as he completed more than 90% of the race distance.

24 Hours of Le Mans results

Complete FIA World Endurance Championship results

Complete European Le Mans Series results

‡ Half points awarded as less than 75% of race distance was completed.

WRC results

Complete WeatherTech SportsCar Championship results

Complete TCR Europe Touring Car Series results
(key) (Races in bold indicate pole position) (Races in italics indicate fastest lap)

Complete GT World Challenge Europe Sprint Cup results
(key) (Races in bold indicate pole position) (Races in italics indicate fastest lap)

References

External links

 
 

1988 births
Living people
Sportspeople from Reims
French racing drivers
French Formula Renault 2.0 drivers
Formula Renault Eurocup drivers
Euroformula Open Championship drivers
Formula 3 Euro Series drivers
GP2 Series drivers
Superleague Formula drivers
24 Hours of Le Mans drivers
FIA World Endurance Championship drivers
European Le Mans Series drivers
Karting World Championship drivers
Epsilon Euskadi drivers
SG Formula drivers
RC Motorsport drivers
Durango drivers
World Series Formula V8 3.5 drivers
Signature Team drivers
WeatherTech SportsCar Championship drivers
JDC Motorsports drivers
World Rally Championship drivers
Boutsen Ginion Racing drivers
TCR Europe Touring Car Series drivers